LAMR may refer to:

Lamar Advertising Company
 Linux, Apache, MySQL, Ruby, LAMP-like software bundle
 Laminin receptor, also known as ribosomal protein SA
Los Angeles Metro Rail